Main River is a Canadian rural community located in Kent County, New Brunswick.

References

Communities in Kent County, New Brunswick